Pablo Pallarés Marzo (born 12 January 1987) is a Spanish footballer who plays for Svay Rieng mainly as a forward.

Club career
Pallarés was born in Gandia, Valencian Community. After unsuccessfully emerging through Atlético Madrid's youth ranks, he started playing as a professional in Segunda División B, starting with CF Palencia in 2007–08 (only one goal in 946 minutes of action, team relegation). In the following three seasons he played with four teams in that level, his best individual year being with CD Roquetas.

On 4 June 2011, Pallarés signed with UD Almería, playing initially for their reserves. On 13 December he made his debut with the Andalusians' first team, coming off the bench for Aarón Ñíguez in a 1–3 Copa del Rey home loss against CA Osasuna (2–4 on aggregate).

In August 2012, after appearing in roughly only one quarter of the Segunda División games in his only season, Pallarés returned to division three after joining San Fernando CD. He continued to compete in that tier in the following years, representing La Hoya Lorca CF, FC Cartagena, SD Huesca, UCAM Murcia CF and SD Ponferradina.

In January 2018, 31-year-old Pallarés moved abroad for the first time in his career, signing with Malaysia Super League club Kedah FA.

References

External links

1987 births
Living people
People from Gandia
Sportspeople from the Province of Valencia
Spanish footballers
Footballers from the Valencian Community
Association football forwards
Segunda División players
Segunda División B players
Atlético Madrid C players
CF Palencia footballers
CD Dénia footballers
Águilas CF players
CD Alcoyano footballers
CD Roquetas footballers
UD Almería B players
UD Almería players
San Fernando CD players
Lorca FC players
FC Cartagena footballers
SD Huesca footballers
UCAM Murcia CF players
SD Ponferradina players
CD Guijuelo footballers
CF Badalona players
UD Socuéllamos players
Malaysia Super League players
Kedah Darul Aman F.C. players
ND Gorica players
Spanish expatriate footballers
Expatriate footballers in Malaysia
Expatriate footballers in Slovenia
Spanish expatriate sportspeople in Malaysia
Spanish expatriate sportspeople in Slovenia